The Banska river , also known as Dobrichka reka   is a river in Haskovo Province, southeastern Bulgaria.

The Banska springs out from the base of St.Elias Peak(801.3 m)  at 686 m altitude in the Eastern Rhodopes. It passes through  the villages of Susam, Tatarevo, Garvanovo, Klokotnitsa, Kasnakovo and Dobrich. Between Tatarevo and Garvanovo it forms the Boaza Gorge. The river flows into the Maritsa near Dimitrovgrad as a right tributary.

In 1230 the Battle of Klokotnitsa occurred near the banks of the river.

The Banska River is inhabited by a large number of fish species, including the Mullet, Danube Bleak, the Carassius, Vimba and the Common Nase.

References

Rivers of Bulgaria
Landforms of Haskovo Province